Robin Charles Raja (born 30 July 1966) is a former Indian football player and former head coach of the I-League side Chennai City. He is currently the coach of Chennai FC, which competes in the CFA Senior Division league.

Coaching career
Born in Tamil Nadu, Raja has served as the head coach of various local state clubs in the CFA Senior Division. He won the league with both Chennai Customs and Hindustan Eagles in 2010 and 2012 respectively. He also coached Chennai FC in the league in 2016. Raja has also coached Tamil Nadu in the Santosh Trophy. During the 2016 edition of the tournament, Raja lead his state side to the semi-finals of the tournament. His side lost 1–0.

Chennai City
Raja was named the head coach of Chennai City in December 2016 after the club were granted direct-entry into the I-League. He was sacked in January 2017 after "due to unsatisfactory results" with the team lying on the bottom of the table then, following just one win after the first seven games.

Statistics

Managerial statistics
.

Personal life
Robin Charles Raja is married to Angela Lincy Vasanthakumari. His wife is also a sportsperson. She won the high jump for women and set a national record of 1.72m, at the National Games in Thiruvananthapuram, Kerala, in the year 1987. She was 15 years old when she set this record. Angela Lincy is from Nazareth, Tamil Nadu. Also, she is an alumnus of St. Johns Girls Higher Secondary School, Nazareth. They have a daughter, who is also a sportsperson, her name is Abhisheka Shannon, she is a squash player and she is a national champion at the junior level.

References

External links
 Robin Charles Raja profile at All India Football Federation

1966 births
Living people
Footballers from Tamil Nadu
Indian footballers
Indian football managers
Chennai City FC head coaches
I-League managers
Association footballers not categorized by position